Events from 2022 in Vanuatu.

Incumbents 

 President: Tallis Obed Moses (until 6 July), Seule Simeon (acting), Nikenike Vurobaravu (from 23 July)
 Prime Minister: Bob Loughman (until 4 November); Ishmael Kalsakau onwards

Events 

 Ongoing – COVID-19 pandemic in Oceania
 Early 2022 – 2022 Hunga Tonga–Hunga Ha'apai eruption and tsunami

 18 August – An explosion destroyed a barge at Southwest Bay on the island of Malekula.
 13 October – 2022 Vanuatuan general election: Vanuatuans head to the polls in a snap election to vote for the members of their parliament.
4 November – Ishmael Kalsakau is elected unopposed by secret ballot as the new prime minister, succeeding Bob Loughman.

Elections 

 2022 Vanuatuan general election
 2022 Vanuatuan presidential election

Sports 

 Vanuatu at the 2022 Commonwealth Games
 Vanuatu at the 2022 World Athletics Championships

References 

 
2020s in Vanuatu
Years of the 21st century in Vanuatu
Vanuatu
Vanuatu